The 2001 FIS Freestyle World Ski Championships were held between January 17 to January 21 at the Whistler-Blackcomb ski resort in British Columbia near Vancouver, British Columbia, Canada.  The World Championships featured both men's and women's events in the Moguls, Aerials and Dual Moguls.

Results
The moguls and aerials events held qualifying rounds and finals.  Men's and Women's qualifying and final rounds were held on the same day with two days in between the qualifying and final rounds of each sex.  The Dual Moguls event for both sexes held only a finals round.

Men's results

Moguls
The men's quarterfinals took place on January 17 followed by the finals on January 19.

Aerials
The men's quarterfinals took place on January 18 followed by the finals on January 20.

Dual Moguls
The men's finals took place on January 21.

Women's results

Moguls
The women's quarterfinals took place on January 17 followed by the finals on January 19.

Aerials
The women's quarterfinals took place on January 18 followed by the finals on January 20.

Dual Moguls
The women's finals took place on January 21.

References

External links
 FIS Home
 Results from the FIS

2001
2001 in British Columbia
2001 in freestyle skiing
Freestyle skiing competitions in Canada